The Gallatin School of Individualized Study (commonly referred to as Gallatin) is a small interdisciplinary college within New York University (NYU). Students at Gallatin design an interdisciplinary program that meets their specific interests and career goals. Coursework can be taken at any of the schools that compose NYU, in addition to the school's offerings.

History

Founded in 1972 as the University Without Walls, the school was renamed the Gallatin Division in 1976 after Albert Gallatin, Secretary of the Treasury under Thomas Jefferson and the founder of NYU. In 1995, the school took its current name, the Gallatin School of Individualized Study.

Herbert London was the school's first dean through 1992. The Gallatin building is situated within the campus of New York University just east of Washington Square Park, at 1 Washington Place in Manhattan, New York City.

The Gallatin School's facilities on the corner of Washington Place and Broadway underwent a redesign in 2007–8. It was the first renovation project at NYU to achieve LEED certification. The project earned a LEED Gold certification for renovating five floors (approximately 32,000 square feet) of the existing building, including the construction of a theater, art gallery, classrooms, studios, and offices. The main building is named after Georgina Bloomberg.

Academics

Gallatin students develop a concentration, as opposed to a major, that is individualized to suit their interests and goals. A concentration can encompass multiple areas of study and often involves taking courses in various schools within NYU. There are, however, general requirements for graduation. These start with foundation courses and end with an intensive oral examination.

References

External links
 Gallatin School of Individualized Study
 New York University
 Gallatin Student Activities

New York University schools
Liberal arts colleges in New York City
Educational institutions established in 1972
1972 establishments in New York City